Seydelia turlini is a moth in the family Erebidae. It was described by Hervé de Toulgoët in 1976. It is found in the Democratic Republic of the Congo and Rwanda.

Subspecies
Seydelia turlini turlini (Rwanda)
Seydelia turlini celsicola Toulgoët, 1976 (Rwanda, Democratic Republic of the Congo: Orientale)

References

Moths described in 1976
Spilosomina